Ďurďošík is a village and municipality in Košice-okolie District in the Košice Region of eastern Slovakia.

History
In historical records the village was first mentioned in 1330.

Geography
The village lies at an altitude of 233 metres and covers an area of 4.590 km².
It has a population of 350 people.

Ethnicity
The population is 99% Slovak in ethnicity.

Government
The village relies on the police force and fire brigade at Bidovce and the district and tax offices are located at Košice.

Culture
The village has a small public library.

Transport
The nearest railway station is located at Košice, 15 kilometres away.

Genealogical resources

The records for genealogical research are available at the state archive "Statny Archiv in Kosice, Slovakia"

 Roman Catholic church records (births/marriages/deaths): 1734-1895 (parish B)
 Greek Catholic church records (births/marriages/deaths): 1788-1912 (parish B)
 Lutheran church records (births/marriages/deaths): 1775-1895 (parish B))

See also
 List of municipalities and towns in Slovakia

External links
http://www.statistics.sk/mosmis/eng/run.html
Surnames of living people in Durdosik

Villages and municipalities in Košice-okolie District